Matt Bianco are a British band that were formed in 1983. They are mainly known for their success in the mid-1980s and their jazz, Latin-flavoured music. The group's name suggests that Matt Bianco is a person, often assumed to be an alias for the main member and front man Mark Reilly. According to the group, however, Matt is in fact "a made up spy, a secret agent; we loved spy TV themes and film scores".

Early years
Matt Bianco was formed in 1983 by Mark Reilly (vocals), Danny White (keyboard), Kito Poncioni (bass) – all of whom had just left art pop group Blue Rondo A La Turk – and vocalist Basia Trzetrzelewska. The band called itself "Bronze" before settling on the name Matt Bianco in 1983.

The group was pictured as a quartet for their first single ("Get Out of Your Lazy Bed"/"Big Rosie"), although Poncioni only played on the non-album B-side "Big Rosie". He dropped out of the group entirely before the recording of their first album Whose Side Are You On? (1984), although he received a co-writing credit on the track "Half A Minute". The album spawned several UK and European hits, including "Get Out of Your Lazy Bed", "More Than I Can Bear", "Half a Minute" and "Sneaking Out The Back Door". The album made the top 3 in Germany and number 1 in Austria. The title track was not a hit in the UK, although it was a minor hit in Canada and Australia.

In 1984, whilst promoting Whose Side Are You On?, the group appeared on the children's TV show Saturday Superstore, and during a live phone-in, a caller named Simon Roberts said, "hello, Matt Bianco […] you're a bunch of wankers." This moment of profanity has become infamous in the history of children's television in the UK. However, this incident did not stop the band appearing on subsequent BBC Children's TV programmes.

Trzetrzelewska and White formed a romantic relationship, and left the group soon after the first album so that Trzetrzelewska could pursue an international solo career. Jenni Evans became the new female singer, and Mark Fisher became songwriter, producer, and keyboard player. This line-up recorded the Matt Bianco album, which was released in 1986. The hit "Yeh Yeh", a cover of Georgie Fame's hit, reached number 13 on the UK Singles Chart, and number 7 in Germany.

Reilly-Fisher duo years
With the addition of Mark Fisher, the sound changed considerably. Fisher, a keyboardist, composer and studio wizard, contributed a more contemporary sound, compared to that of the early Matt Bianco. The use of synthesizers increased notably: Yamaha's DX-7 can be heard providing the slap bass in most songs, but the choice of noted studio musicians remained consistent with Ronnie Ross being the most prominent example. After the first album with the new line-up, they took a 13-piece band on to a European tour that saw them perform in front of an audience of more than 250,000 attendees in total. Jenni Evans left the group shortly after the recording of the group's self-titled album and was not replaced.

Bianco was now a household name in Europe, and Warner Brothers sought to market them in the United States. They hired Gloria Estefan's husband and producer Emilio Estefan to produce a few songs, and recorded their third album, Indigo, with the Estefan productions being chosen as singles. 1988's "Don't Blame it on That Girl" and "Good Times" only made a moderate impact. However, "Wap-Bam-Boogie", an album track originally on the B-side of the first single (and which did not involve Estefan in any capacity), did well on the dance charts.  This pushed the joint single release of "Don't Blame it on That Girl"/"Wap-Bam-Boogie" up to Number 11 on the UK Singles Chart, making it Matt Bianco's most successful single.

Their first Greatest Hits album, entitled The Best of Matt Bianco, collecting their greatest hits from 1983 to 1990, was released in 1990 and made the UK Top 50. Another studio album was released in 1991 by Warner Brothers, the fractured Samba in Your Casa, the fourth long-playing by the group. Reilly and Fisher then split from their record company and went freelance. From then on, they recorded their albums in their own studios, and then offered them to independent distributors worldwide.

They scored contracts with ZYX Music and Intercord in Europe, and Victor Entertainment in Asia, but failed to sign on with another major label. The next albums did not sell well in Europe, but they created a loyal fan base in Japan and the rest of Asia. The albums Another Time Another Place, Gran Via, World Go Round, A/Collection (not a greatest hits album, but more of a compilation album, compiling a number of remakes of Matt Bianco's stand-out album tracks plus remixes of a few of their hits), Rico, and Echoes sold well enough for a comfortable lifestyle in the South-East of England.

After twenty years recording and touring, the two split amicably.

2003 - 2015; reunion of the original trio and beyond
Initiated by a mutual friend, Basia and Danny White joined with Mark Reilly to reform the "original" Matt Bianco, in 2003, signing to the Emarcy label. Original bassist Kito Poncioni, who only played on one Matt Bianco track before leaving the band in 1984, had died in the late 1990s.

In 2004, Matt Bianco released the album Matt's Mood, the name from one of their most popular early instrumental tracks. The album featured adult-contemporary/jazz numbers, in the spirit of their first album. The following year, they embarked on a world tour, which included stops in the UK, Japan, and the United States.

Following Matt's Mood, Basia and White left Matt Bianco again to reinvigorate the Basia brand. Reilly reunited with Fisher, and Matt Bianco were back as a duo. Three compilation albums were marketed between 2005 and 2008, including The Best of Matt Bianco – Volume 2, containing many of the Asian tracks, which were so far only available in Germany for European fans, and the re-release of the original 1990 The Best of Matt Bianco, featuring their European hits from 1983 to 1990. In May 2009 Fisher and Reilly released their first album as a duo for eight years in Europe, the UK, and Japan. With HiFi Bossanova the band secured a recording contract with Edel Music in Europe and continued their co-operation with JVC-Victor in Japan which in November 2012 bore fruit again with the release of their latest album Hideaway.

2016 onwards
Mark Reilly (without Mark Fisher) recorded a collaborative album with New Cool Collective in 2016. The Things You Love featured nine new tracks and a re-recording of "Don't Blame it on That Girl"; the collaboration was billed to "New Cool Collective/Matt Bianco (Mark Reilly)".

Mark Fisher died on 12 December 2016. The official Matt Bianco site made it clear that Reilly intended to carry on under the "Matt Bianco" banner, indicating that a new album was in the process of being recorded. This (Gravity) was released in 2017.

In October 2017, Cherry Red Records re-issued their album Matt Bianco in 2CD Deluxe Edition format, having re-issued a similarly packaged version of Whose Side Are You On? in June 2016.

November 2020 saw the release of a second collaboration with New Cool Collective, High Anxiety.

In June 2022 Matt Bianco released 2CD The Essential Matt Bianco. Re-imagined, Re-loved. It featured new latin flavoured 2022 versions of 15 Matt Bianco classics - preceded by the singles "More Than I Can Bear 2022", "Matt's Mood 2022" and "Wap Bam Boogie 2022" - plus 15 re-mixes and special versions.

Discography

Whose Side Are You On? (1984)
Matt Bianco (1986)
Indigo (1988)
Samba in Your Casa (1991)
Another Time Another Place (1994)
Gran Via (1995)
World Go Round (1997)
Rico (2000)
Echoes (2002)
Matt's Mood (2004)
Hifi Bossanova (2009)
Hideaway (2012)
Gravity (2017)
High Anxiety (2020)
The Essential Matt Bianco. Re-imagined, Re-loved (2022)

See also
Sophisti-pop

References

External links
 
 Detailed discography

1983 establishments in England
British soul musical groups
Jazz-funk musicians
Musical groups established in 1983
Sophisti-pop musical groups